Nick or Nicholas Carter may refer to:

Athletes
 Nick Carter (athlete) (1902–1997), track and field athlete from United States, who competed in the 1928 Summer Olympics
 Nick Carter (baseball) (1879–1961), Major League Baseball pitcher for the Philadelphia Athletics in 1908
 Nick Carter (cyclist) (1924–2003), cyclist from New Zealand, who competed in the 1948 Summer Olympics
 Nick Carter (footballer) (born 1978), Australian rules footballer
 Nick Carter (tennis) (1918–1989), tennis player from United States
 Nicholas Carter (cricketer) (born 1978), former English cricketer

Musicians
Nick Carter (singer) (born 1980), American singer, member of the boyband Backstreet Boys
Murs (rapper) (Nick Carter, born 1978), American rapper

Others
Nick Carter (British Army officer) (born 1959), British Army Chief of the Defence Staff
Nick Carter (environmentalist) (died 2000), Zambian environmentalist

Fiction
Nick Carter (literary character), a popular fictional detective
Nick Carter-Killmaster, a series of spy novels named for the fictional detective
Nick Carter, Master Detective, radio series based on the fictional detective
Nick Carter (comic strip), a 1972 Italian comic strip featuring detective Nick Carter